In co-simulation, the different subsystems which form a coupled problem are modeled and simulated in a distributed manner. Hence, the modeling is done on the subsystem level without having the coupled problem in mind. Furthermore, the coupled simulation is carried out by running the subsystems in a black-box manner. During the simulation the subsystems will exchange data. Co-simulation can be considered as the joint simulation of the already well-established tools and semantics; when they are simulated with their suitable solvers. Co-simulation proves its advantage in validation of multi-domain and cyber physical system by offering a
flexible solution which allows consideration of multiple domains with different time steps, at the same time. As the calculation load is shared among simulators, co-simulation also enables the possibility of large scale system assessment.

Abstraction layers of co-simulation framework 

The following introduction and structuration is proposed in.

Establishing a co-simulation framework can be a challenging and complex task, because it requires a strong interoperability among the participating elements, especially in case of multiple-formalism co-simulation. Harmonization, adaptation, and eventually changes of actual employed standards and protocols in individual models needs to be done to be able to integrate into the holistic framework. The generic layered structuration of co-simulation framework  highlights the intersection of domains and the issues that need to be solved in the process of designing a co-simulation framework. In general, a co-simulation framework consists of five abstraction layers:

From conceptual structuration, the architecture on which the co-simulation framework is developed and the formal semantic relations/syntactic formulation are defined. The detailed technical implementation and synchronization techniques are covered in dynamic and technical layers.

Problem Partitioning - Architecture of co-simulation 

The partitioning procedure identifies the process of spatial separation of the coupled problem into multiple partitioned subsystems. Information is exchanged through either ad-hoc interfaces  or via intermediate buffer governed by a master algorithm. Master algorithm (where exists) is responsible for instantiating the simulators and for orchestrating the information exchange (simulator-simulator or simulator-orchestrator).

Coupling methods 

Co-simulation coupling methods can be classified into operational integration and formal integration, depending on abstraction layers. In general, operational integration is used in co-simulation for a specific problem and aims for interoperability at dynamic and technical layers (i.e. signal exchange). On the other hand, formal integration allows interoperability in semantic and syntactic level via either model coupling or simulator coupling. Formal integration often involves a master federate to orchestrate the semantic and syntactic of the interaction among simulators.

From a dynamic and technical point of view, it is necessary to consider the synchronization techniques and communication patterns in the process of implementation.

Communication Patterns 
There exist three principal communication patterns for master algorithms. The Gauss-Seidel, the Jacobi variants and transmission line modelling, TLM. 
The names of the first two methods are derived from the structural similarities to the numerical methods by the same name.

The reason is that the Jacobi method is easy to convert into an equivalent parallel algorithm while there are difficulties to do so for the Gauss-Seidel method.

Gauss-Seidel (serial)

Jacobi (parallel)

Transmission line modelling, TLM 
In transmission line modelling (a.k.a. bi-directional delay line modelling), a capacitance (or inductance) is substituted with a transmission line element with wave propagation. The time delay is set to be one time step. In this way a physically motivated time delay is introduced which means that the system can be partitioned at this location. 
Numerical stability is ensured since there is no numerical error, instead there is a modelling error introduced, which is more benign. This is usually the most simple to implement since it results in an explicit scheme.

References 

Simulation